Levels and Degrees of Light is the debut album by Muhal Richard Abrams which was released on the Delmark label in 1968 and features performances of three of Abrams' compositions by Abrams, Anthony Braxton, Leroy Jenkins, Charles Clark, Gordon Emmanuel, Maurice McIntyre, Thurman Barker and Leonard Jones with vocals by Penelope Taylor and a poetry recitation by David Moore.

Reception

The Allmusic review by Brian Olewnick calling it "a landmark album that launched the first in a long line of beautiful, musical salvos from the AACM toward the mainstream jazz world...  This is a milestone recording and belongs in the collection of any modern jazz fan". The Penguin Guide to Jazz awarded the album 3 stars stating "Levels and Degrees of Light would be a slightly difficult record to place in a blindfold test. It is certainly not untypical of the Chicago experimentation of the period, except it seems much less chaotic, much more responsive to European tradition". The Rolling Stone Jazz Record Guide said the album "features an intriguing first side with wordless vocal and several AACM stalwarts...but falls apart in the poorly recorded wall of sound that covers side two".

Track listing
All compositions by Muhal Richard Abrams except as indicated
 "Levels and Degrees of Light" - 10:33  
 "The Bird Song" (Abrams, David Moore) - 23:00  
 "My Thoughts Are My Future - Now and Forever" - 9:43

Personnel
Muhal Richard Abrams: piano, clarinet
Anthony Braxton: alto saxophone
Maurice McIntyre: tenor saxophone
Leroy Jenkins: violin
Gordon Emmanuel: vibraphone
Charles Clark: bass
Leonard Jones: bass
Thurman Barker: drums
Penelope Taylor: vocals
David Moore: poet (track 2)

References

1968 debut albums
Muhal Richard Abrams albums
Delmark Records albums
Albums produced by Bob Koester